Bukovyna Airlines, also known as Bukovyna Aviation Enterprise, was a Ukrainian charter airline based in Chernivtsi, which operated chartered passenger flights out of Chernivtsi International Airport.

History
The company was founded in 1999. 

In 2013, Bukovyna was one of two Ukrainian airlines that had sanctions imposed against them by the Government of the United States. Bukovyna Airlines was hit with sanctions because it was leasing its US-built McDonnell Douglas MD-80 series aircraft to Iranian airlines Mahan Air and Iran Air. The Iranian airlines were themselves under sanction by the US government.

In February 2021, the Ukrainian authorities revoked the airline's operational license, shutting all operations down.

Fleet

Current fleet
The Bukovyna Airlines fleet consisted of the following aircraft as of September 2020:

Previously operated
 Boeing 737-500
 British Aerospace BAe 146-300
 Fokker 100
 McDonnell Douglas MD-83
 McDonnell Douglas MD-88

References

External links

Official website

Defunct airlines of Ukraine
Airlines established in 1999
Airlines disestablished in 2021
Defunct charter airlines
Ukrainian companies established in 1999
2021 disestablishments in Ukraine